Valley Fair may refer to:
Westfield Valley Fair, a shopping mall straddling the border of San Jose and Santa Clara, California.
Valleyfair, a theme park in Shakopee, Minnesota.
Valley Fair Shopping Center, a shopping mall which existed in Appleton, Wisconsin from 1954 until 2007.